Mabel Stark (December 10, 1889 – April 20, 1968), whose real name was Mary Ann Haynie, was a renowned tiger trainer of the 1920s. She was referred to as one of the world's first women tiger trainers/tamers. In its belated obituary, The New York Times lauded Stark as "one of the most celebrated animal trainers in a field dominated by men."

Biography 
Stark was born on December 10, 1889- but as to where remains ambiguous; as both Kentucky and Tennessee have been given as possible locations of birth. The family later relocated to Cobb near Princeton, Kentucky, where her mother's parents were located. She was one of seven children born to Lela and Hardy Haynie.

Stark's parents were farmers, and they died within two years of each other, so that by the age of 17, Stark and her siblings were orphaned. She spent a short period of time with her aunt Kate Pettypoole in Princeton. She then traveled to Louisville and became a nurse at St. Mary's Hospital. Soon after, she left Louisville, and her history becomes difficult to trace.

Circus friends contend that she worked in carnivals as a "dancer" of some type. (Like many circus performers, Stark did not hesitate to enrich the truth to create an interesting story. She even once told an interviewer that she was born to a wealthy Canadian.)

She ended up in 1911 with the Al G. Barnes Circus based in Culver City, California, where she met animal trainer Al Sands. She worked for a brief time there as a "high school" rider (horseback rider) but fervently wanted to work with the big cats. She began work with Louis Roth, a famous "cat man" she would later marry. (Stark was married four or five times.)

Soon, she became a tiger trainer in the ring. At first, they had her work a "balloon act", which had her "riding" a lion on a platform and then pressing a pedal to release fireworks at some point in the act. But by 1916, she was presenting the show's major tiger act.

On February 18, 1916, Stark was severely mauled by a lion named Louie while rehearsing for the Pacific Electric exhibit of the National Orange Show in San Bernardino, California. Stark's husband, Louis Roth, fired blank cartridges from a revolver into the face of the lion amid the screams of his wife and spectators who had gathered to watch the rehearsal. The lion seized Stark's left arm into its mouth and rolled over a number of times. (Roth had also been mauled earlier that day by a lion named Jeff. He suffered deep injuries to his arm before firing blanks into the animal's open jaws.)

Stark was dragged unconscious from the cage and rushed to a hospital where she was treated for a mangled and broken arm. This was Stark's third mauling in as many years. In 1914, while in Detroit, Michigan, she was attacked by her leopards during a parade, and during the winter of 1915, she was mangled in Venice, California.

She adopted a mangy, sickly tiger cub named Rajah and raised him to perform a famous wrestling act with her. She accomplished this by romping and playing with the cub at the beach and actually keeping him as a pet in her apartment. According to Stark's autobiography, "Rajah would run straight toward me. Up he went on his hind legs, his forefeet around my neck. We turned around once or twice, I threw him to the ground, and we rolled three or four times. I opened his mouth and put my face inside, then jumped to my feet".

In 1922, she was asked to join the Ringling Bros. and Barnum & Bailey Circus where she performed in Madison Square Garden with tigers and a black panther. By the end of that season, of the six wild animal acts featured with the circus, Stark's was clearly the greatest success. In 1923, she starred in the Ringling center ring, but two years later in 1925, the circus banned all wild animal acts.

After a sojourn to Europe where she performed in a circus, she came back to the US in 1928 and began work with the John Robinson Show.  In Bangor, Maine, she lost her footing in a muddy arena and was seriously mauled by her tigers.  She suffered a wound that almost severed her leg, face lacerations, a hole in her shoulder, a torn deltoid, and a host of other injuries.  She was rescued by fellow trainer Terrell Jacobs and returned to the ring in a matter of weeks, swathed in bandages and walking with a cane. She suffered numerous maulings and serious injuries over her nearly 60 years of working with tigers.  At one point in her career, she would face 18 big cats in the ring.

She performed with the Sells-Floto Circus in 1929 and then rejoined Barnes after it had been sold to Ringling in 1930. She stayed there until it was absorbed into Ringling Bros. and Barnum & Bailey during the season of 1938. In 1932, she and her tiger act was filmed for the Paramount Pictures motion picture King of the Jungle.  In the film, Stark is seen putting her tigers through their paces when fire erupts in the big top. She toured with small circuses and lived in Japan where she performed her circus act in the '50s.

She returned to California and finished her career at the Jungle Compound (later called Jungleland) in Thousand Oaks. Stark appeared occasionally on television in the 1960s.  For example, she did a stint as one of the guests with an unusual occupation on What's My Line?, the popular Sunday night CBS-TV program.

In 1968, Jungleland was sold to a new owner who disliked Stark and fired her. Soon after she left, one of her tigers escaped and was shot. Stark was angry and hurt about the animal's destruction, and felt that she could have safely secured the tiger if the owners had asked for her assistance.

Three months later, she committed suicide by taking an overdose of barbiturates.  In the last pages of her autobiography, Hold That Tiger, Stark writes: "The chute door opens as I crack my whip and shout, 'Let them come,' Out slink the striped cats, snarling and roaring, leaping at each other or at me.  It's a matchless thrill, and life without it is not worth while to me."

She died on April 20, 1968.

Legacy 
In 2001, a fictionalized biography of Stark's life by author Robert Hough titled The Final Confession of Mabel Stark was published. The story is based in 1968, the same year that Stark committed suicide. It is a fictionalized account of the events of her life. The screenplay was optioned by director Sam Mendes with the hopes of making a film starring his wife Kate Winslet; however, no production schedule has been announced. A documentary titled Mabel, Mabel, Tiger Trainer directed by Leslie Zemeckis premiered in 2017.

See also
 Irina Bugrimova

References

External links 
  Note: IMDB uses the incorrect date of death.
 Mabel Stark: The Lady with the Tigers from Mental Floss
 History of Jungleland mentioning Mabel Stark, sponsored by Jungleland skates
 Winslet and Mendes team up for Mabel Stark movie
 Husband and Wife unite to make film about Circus Tiger Tamer

1889 births
1968 suicides
American circus performers
Drug-related suicides in California
Ringling Bros. and Barnum & Bailey Circus people
People from Princeton, Kentucky
People from Thousand Oaks, California
Lion tamers
1968 deaths